Hwy 55 Burgers Shakes & Fries is a fast casual restaurant chain that operates primarily in the state of North Carolina and other neighboring states on the east coast of the United States. Founded by Kenney Moore as Andy's Cheesesteaks and Cheeseburgers, the first location opened in Goldsboro, North Carolina, in 1991.  In 2012, seeking to expand beyond North Carolina, the company changed their name to Hwy 55 and opened their first out-of-state restaurant in May of that year. As of February, 2022, the chain has a total of 108 locations in the United States, primarily in North Carolina (81) and South Carolina (12), with 15 other locations in the states of Florida, Georgia, Montana, Ohio, Tennessee, Texas, Virginia, and West Virginia.  The restaurant serves hamburgers, cheesesteaks, sandwiches, salads, hand-dipped ice cream and milkshakes.

History and operations

Kenney Moore began the business in 1991 by opening a now-defunct restaurant in Goldsboro, North Carolina's Berkeley Mall. He asked the owners of his equipment to in-house finance his operation as he only had $500 to his name. Moore quickly acquired three more closed restaurants and found himself $30,000 in debt to his foodservice distributor. After adapting Robert K. Greenleaf's philosophy of servant leadership, his fortunes turned. Moore switched to a franchisee style of ownership and Andy's Cheesesteaks and Cheeseburgers expanded throughout Eastern North Carolina.

In February 2012, Andy's announced that it had changed its name to Hwy 55 Burgers, Shakes & Fries, as a means to avoid potential lawsuits with other similarly named restaurants, once it decided to expand outside of North Carolina.  The name is a homage to North Carolina Highway 55, and many of the locations in the state were painted with a mural map showing the route of the highway. The company's decor, always influenced by 1950s-era diners, also took on a pink-and-teal color scheme. In May, the company opened a franchised store in Myrtle Beach, South Carolina, the first location outside the state of North Carolina. The first international locations followed in 2014 with openings in Abu Dhabi.  The Abu Dhabi location later closed.

In 2013, Hwy 55 was named a top-40 food franchise by the Franchise Business Review.

By February 2022, the chain had 108 locations in nine U.S. states, including North Carolina (81), South Carolina (12), Tennessee (6), Georgia (2), Texas (2), Montana (1), Ohio (1), Virginia (1) and West Virginia (1).

Restaurants
A Hwy 55 restaurant usually has a 1950s theme, with pink-and-teal color accents and '50s decor mounted on the walls. Kitchens are open, whereby customers can watch cooks grill their food.

Charity 
In 2006, Kenney Moore created the Andy's Charitable Foundation, Inc. as a 501(C)3 corporation with the "mission to serve the common good of all people in our hometowns."   Now known as the Hwy 55 Foundation, as of 2021, it had raised over $1,900,000 for local charities, including the Miracle League of the Triangle, of which it is a major sponsor. A Miracle League field in Cary, North Carolina is named after the foundation.

References

External links
 

Restaurants in North Carolina
Regional restaurant chains in the United States
Fast casual restaurants
Restaurants established in 1991
1991 establishments in North Carolina